Lysoka Moliwe is a village in the Buea Subdivision of the Fako Division of the South West Region of Cameroon.

Overview 
Lysoka Moliwe is a third class chiefdom in the Buea Council Area.

There is a Presbyterian Church and the Government Technical College Lysoka, which was opened in about 2006.

References 

Populated places in Southwest Region (Cameroon)